Mosstowie railway station served the hamlet of Miltonduff, Moray, Scotland from 1858 to 1955 on the Inverness and Aberdeen Junction Railway.

History 
The station opened on 25 March 1858 by the Inverness and Aberdeen Junction Railway. It closed to both passengers and goods traffic on 7 March 1955.

References

External links 

Disused railway stations in Moray
Former Highland Railway stations
Railway stations in Great Britain opened in 1858
Railway stations in Great Britain closed in 1955
1858 establishments in Scotland
1955 disestablishments in Scotland